The Institute of World Politics (IWP) is a private graduate school of national security, intelligence, and international affairs in Washington, D.C., and Reston, Virginia. Founded in 1990, the school offers courses related to intelligence, national security, and diplomatic communities.

History
The Institute of World Politics (IWP) was founded in 1990 by John Lenczowski, the former director of European and Soviet Affairs at the United States National Security Council during the Reagan administration. His stated purpose for establishing the Institute was to develop a graduate school and curriculum that teaches students to apply "all the instruments of statecraft" across the spectrum of conflict but to remain grounded in American founding principles and the rule of international law.

From 1991 to 2005, it maintained an affiliation with Boston University. This affiliation ended in 2006, as IWP attained independent accreditation by the Middle States Commission on Higher Education. IWP is licensed to operate in Washington, DC by the DC Higher Education Licensure Commission and in Virginia by the State Council of Higher Education for Virginia. 

In 2008, IWP became one of 17 academic institutions qualified by the US Army to host Senior Service Fellows.

IWP awarded LTG Michael Flynn an Honorary Doctorate of Laws.

Academics
The Institute of World Politics is accredited by the Middle States Commission on Higher Education. The institute provides one Doctor of Statecraft and National Security program, five Master of Arts degrees, and 17 graduate certificates. It houses the Kosciuszko Chair of Polish Studies, the Center for Culture and Security, and the Center for Human Rights and International Affairs.

Doctor of Statecraft and National Security 
The Doctor of Statecraft and National Security (Professional) (DSNS) is a degree targeted towards those who wish to pursue national security, as opposed to teaching. In contrast to most Ph.D. programs, it avoids extreme specialization in favor of broad understanding.

Notable faculty 
 Marek Jan Chodakiewicz, Director of the Center for Intermarium Studies 
 Matthew Daniels, founder of Good of All
 Paul A. Goble, former Special Advisor to the Secretary of State
 Ambassador G. Philip Hughes, former official with the White House and Departments of State, Commerce and Defense
 Joshua Muravchik, writer and specialist on U.S. foreign policy
 Michael Pillsbury, senior fellow and director for Chinese strategy at Hudson Institute 
 Albert Santoli, Founder and Director of Asia America Initiative 
 Henry D. Sokolski, executive director of the Nonproliferation Policy Education Center 

Professors emeriti include S. Eugene Poteat and Ambassador Alberto Martinez Piedra.

Former faculty 

 Sebastian Gorka
 Mackubin Thomas Owens
 Juliana Geran Pilon
 Richard W. Rahn
 Herbert Romerstein

Students
The 150 member student body is approximately 65% recent graduates planning to pursue careers in national security, foreign policy, or intelligence and about 35% mid-career professionals in those fields seeking additional credentials. Holding a security clearance is not a prerequisite for studying at IWP, as all coursework takes place at an unclassified level.

Campus
The Institute of World Politics is located in the Dupont Circle neighborhood of Washington, D.C. Its campus consists of two buildings, the Marlatt Mansion and Bently Hall, both of which contain classrooms and administrative offices. Both building are designated contributing properties to the Sixteenth Street Historic District. Bently Hall at the Institute is named for Donald E. Bently, a longtime Institute Board member and major financial supporter of the Institute. 

The Institute holds the private library of former CIA Director William Casey and the American Security Council Foundation Library.

In 2020, IWP opened a campus in Reston, Virginia.

Funding
Donald E. Bently purchased the Marlatt Mansion and two adjacent townhouses for the Institute. For the first 15 years, he rented the building to the Institute for $1.00 per year. He paid several million dollars to renovate the townhouses and later donated them to the Institute. He also endowed the Donald E. Bently Chair of Political Economy.

The institute is a 501(c)(3) non-profit, tax-exempt educational institution, relying on private charitable donations and tuition. Tuition accounts for approximately 65% of annual operating expenses.

Notable alumni 
 Brian Mennes, United States Army general officer
 Mohammad Shafiq Hamdam, social activist, writer, political analyst and former senior media and public diplomacy advisor at NATO
 Eerik Marmei, Former Ambassador of Estonia to the U.S.
 Major General John Thomson, Former Commandant of Cadets and the United States Military Academy at West Point, and current Commanding General of the 1st Cavalry Division
 Mark Tooley, President of the Institute on Religion and Democracy
Zak Allal, a medical doctor for the United Nations in Algeria and non-resident scholar at IWP

See also 
 List of diplomatic training institutions

References

External links
 

The Institute of World Politics
Educational institutions established in 1990
1990 establishments in Washington, D.C.
Intelligence education
Intelligence assessment
International relations education
Schools of international relations